Zantedeschia  is a genus of eight species of herbaceous, perennial, flowering plants in the family Araceae, native to southern Africa from South Africa north to Malawi. The genus has been introduced on all continents except Antarctica. Common names include arum lily for Z. aethiopica and calla and calla lily for Z. elliottiana and Z. rehmannii, although members of the genus are neither true lilies of Liliaceae, true Arums, nor true Callas (related genera in Araceae). The colourful flowers and leaves of both species and cultivars are greatly valued and commonly grown as ornamental plants.

Description 
Zantedeschia species are rhizomatous, herbaceous, perennial plants with some species, e. g., Zantedeschia aethiopica, growing to 1.2m tall, while Zantedeschia rehmannii does not exceed 60 cm in height, growing in clumps or clusters.
Roots: Contractile, emerging from the top of the tubers in Group II.
Stem: The underground portion is variously described as a thick underground stem, i. e., a rhizome or tuber. While the literature is confusing as to the exact terminology, generally the Zantedeschia aethiopica-Zantedeschia odorata group (Group I) is considered to have rhizomes and the remaining species tubers. The rhizomes are fleshy and branched. 

Leaves: Petioles are long, spongy, sheathed at the bases, and of varying lengths, from 15 cm (Zantedeschia rehmannii) to 1.5 m (Zantedeschia aethiopica). The lamina is simple, elongated, and coriaceous with a variety of shapes, including triangular, oval (ovate), with or without a point (elliptic), heart-shaped (cordate), spear-shaped (hastate), lance-shaped (lanceolate), oblong, or circular (orbicular). 15–60 cm in length, 5–25 cm in width. The leaves are dark green in colour, feather-veined (pinnate), and may be erect or spreading with undulate margins. Some species exhibit transparent flecking (maculation), and are therefore described as maculate, while others are immaculate. (see Table I, also New Zealand Calla Council Leaf Shape Images) The leaves contain hydathodes that result in guttation.

Inflorescence: Takes the form of a solitary pseudanthium (false flower), with a showy white or yellow spathe (a specialised petal like bract) shaped like a funnel with a yellow, central, finger-like spadix, which carries the true flowers. Both spathe and spadix are carried on or above the leaves on the fleshy flower stem. The shape of the spathe whose overlapping margins form the tubes varies from trumpet shaped (Z. pentlandii) to a tight tube with a tapering tip (Z. rehmannii). The spathe is initially green, but as it unfolds becomes coloured. This may be white as in Z. aethiopica, but other species include yellow and pink. Cultivars have a wide variety of other spathe colours including orange and purple. Inside the spathe, the throat may be darkly coloured. The spathe acts to attract pollinators.
Flowers: Zantedeschia is monoecious, in which separate male (staminate) and female (pistillate) flowers ("imperfect" or "unisexual" flowers) are carried on the spadix. The flowers are small and non-blooming without a perianth. The male flowers contain two to three stamens fused to form a synandrium, and the female flowers have a single, compound pistil with three fused carpels and three locules.

Fruit: Beaked orange or red berries.

Taxonomy 
Zantedeschia is the sole genus in the tribe Zantedeschieae in a 1997 classification of the Araceae.

Species 

Eight species are currently recognized:

 Zantedeschia aethiopica (L.) Spreng. – giant white arum lily or common arum lily - South Africa, Eswatini, Lesotho
 Zantedeschia albomaculata (Hook.) Baill. – spotted arum lily - widespread from South Africa north to Nigeria and Tanzania 
 Zantedeschia elliottiana (W.Watson) Engl. – yellow or golden arum lily - Mpumalanga Province of South Africa
 Zantedeschia jucunda Letty - Leolo Mountains of northern South Africa
 Zantedeschia odorata P.L.Perry - Western Cape Province
 Zantedeschia pentlandii (R.Whyte ex W.Watson) Wittm. - Mpumalanga Province of South Africa
 Zantedeschia rehmannii Engl. – pink arum lily - South Africa, Eswatini, Mozambique
 Zantedeschia valida (Letty) Y.Singh - KwaZulu-Natal Province of South Africa

Etymology 
The name of the genus was given as a tribute to Italian botanist Giovanni Zantedeschi (1773–1846) by the German botanist Kurt Sprengel (1766–1833).

Distribution and habitat 
All species are endemic to central and southern Africa, from Nigeria to Tanzania and South Africa. Z. aethiopica grows naturally in marshy areas and is only deciduous when water becomes scarce. It grows continuously when watered and fed regularly and can survive periods of minor frosts. Z. aethiopica is a very strong and sturdy plant, being able to grow in many soils and habitats, multiplying by rhizome-offsets; it is naturalised and regarded as a weed throughout much of the world. Z. odorata is a rare species, resembling Z. aethiopica, but deciduous and smelling like freesia, endemic to a few localities in South Africa. Z. albomaculata is a widespread and variable species, growing from South Africa north to Kenya, varying in shades of white to cream and pink to orange-shades.  Z. jucunda and Z. pentlandii are rare species with large yellow showy flowers. Z. rehmannii is a  pink-flowered species with sword shaped leaves. Z. elliotiana is known from horticultural sources only and is probably of hybrid origin.

Introduction 
Zantedeschia was introduced to Europe in the seventeenth century as Z. aethiopica, and is now widely naturalised in Europe, North America, Central America, South America, Oceania, and Australasia. In many places it is considered a dangerous invasive species that displaces native vegetation. In the South-West of Western Australia, Z. aethiopica was introduced for horticulture, but has become a widespread and conspicuous weed of watercourses, heath, and wet pastures to the extent that it has been declared a pest in Western Australia and landowners must control it and attempts to sell plants must be reported.  Zantedeschia in North America is primarily grown as ornamental cultivars in home gardens.

Habitat 
Z. aethiopica grows naturally in marshy areas and is only deciduous when water becomes scarce. It grows continuously when watered and fed regularly and can survive periods of minor frosts. Z. aethiopica is a very strong and sturdy plant, being able to grow in many soils and habitats, multiplying by rhizome-offsets.

Cultivation 
All Zantedeschia produce large, showy flowers spathes and are often grown both as ornamental plants and for cut flowers. Zantedeschia are relatively hardy plants, but some are more winter-hardy than others. In this regard there may be considered two groups, a hardy outdoor group with large white flowers (arum lilies) and less hardy group with white-spotted leaves and flowers in many colours (calla lilies), such as yellow, orange, pink and purple.

Hardy forms (arum lilies) 
These include Zantedeschia aethiopica and Zantedeschia pentlandii and their cultivars. Zantedeschia aethiopica and some of its relatives can survive at minimum winter temperatures below -23 °C (USDA Zone 6) and many others can be grown in even warmer areas where all the ground does not freeze (USDA Zone 7). Z. pentlandii hybrids include 'Millennium Gold'.

Tender forms (calla lilies) 
The more tender specimens are mainly cultivars (hybrids) of Zantedeschia elliotiana and Zantedeschia rehmannii (referred to as elliotiana or rehmannii cultivars or hybrids, or as e.g. Z. × rehmanii), but also Zantedeschia albomaculata and Zantedeschia jucunda. These less hardy forms can only survive winter temperatures to −12 °C (Zones 8). This plant must be grown as tender bulbs or houseplants in cooler areas. Species and hybrids between Z. elliotiana, Z. jucunda, Z. pentlandii and Z. rehmannii appear to have an optimum temperature for growth near 25 °C, with growth being suppressed once daily average temperatures persist at 28 °C.

Z. rehmannii hybrids include 'Amethyst', 'Crystal Blush' and 'Neon Amour', while an example of a Z. elliotiana × Z. rehmannii hybrid would be 'Blaze'. Z. elliotiana × Z. maculata hybrids include 'Lemon Drop'. Z. elliotiana hybrids include 'Solar Flare'.

Seasonal grouping 
Other classifications consider two groups based on their seasonal habits. Zantedeschia aethiopica and Zantedeschia odorata form one group (Group I) typified by retaining their leaves in winter, and flowering from late winter to late spring, while the remaining species (Group II) are in leaf from spring to late autumn shedding their leaves in winter (deciduous) and flower during the summer. Zantedeschia aethiopica may retain its leaves all year round (evergreen), otherwise from autumn to late summer, while Zantedeschia odorata retains its leaves from late winter to late spring. The two groups also vary according to the arrangement of the male and female organs. In the first group they are arranged  together in the lower part of the spadix, whereas in the latter they are separate, with the female at the base. The Z. aethiopica group also have a fruit that turns soft and orange, whereas the other retains a firm green fruit.

Toxicity 
Zantedeschia shares the general properties of the family Araceae in causing contact irritation. Zantedeschia species are also poisonous due to the presence of calcium oxalate crystals in the form of raphides. All parts of the plant are poisonous, typically producing local irritation or a burning sensation in the mouth and occasionally vomiting and diarrhea. However leaves are sometimes cooked and eaten.

Uses 

Extensive commercial production of Zantedeschia for cut flowers and/or planting material occurs in California, Colombia, New Zealand and Kenya.  Plant breeders in California and New Zealand continue to produce an extensive range of new hybrid cultivars. The so-called white calla derived from Z. aethiopica. All varieties with flowers with shades of yellow, orange, red, purple are mainly derived from Z. albomaculata, Z. pentlandii, Z. elliottiana and Z. rehmanni.

Culture 
Zantedeschia has often been used in paintings and is featured in many of Diego Rivera's works of art (see The Flower Vendor, amongst others). It was a favourite subject of the painter Georgia O'Keeffe.

During the flower language boom in the Victorian era, there were strict social codes and flowers were considered the best medium to express  feelings. Flowers delivered their messages subtly and every aspect of flower-gifting carried specific meanings, from the person who made the offer to the way the flowers were arranged. Each type of flower was associated with a specific, symbolic meaning. Due to the calla lily's resemblance to female genitalia, a gift of calla lily delivered an overtly sexual message. This meaning was popularized by admirers like Freud and artists like Georgia O'Keeffe.

References

External links 

 Pacific Callas
 Germplasm Resources Information Network (GRIN): Zantedeschia
 University of Connecticut: Zantedeschia aethiopica
 University of Connecticut: Zantedeschia elliottiana
 Snijder, R.C. 2004. Genetics of Erwinia resistance in Zantedeschia: impact of plastome-genome incompatibility. PhD thesis Wageningen University.  - p. 112.

 
Araceae genera
Garden plants of Southern Africa